Hitchie Creek Provincial Park is a provincial park in the Canadian province of British Columbia, west of the north end of Nitinat Lake on the west coast of Vancouver Island, north-east of Bamfield.

See also
List of protected areas of British Columbia

References

West Coast of Vancouver Island
Provincial parks of British Columbia
1995 establishments in British Columbia
Protected areas established in 1995